Dame Jane Elizabeth Ailwên Phillips  (born 14 May 1933), known professionally as Siân Phillips, is a Welsh actress. She has performed the title roles in Ibsen's Hedda Gabler and George Bernard Shaw's Saint Joan.

Early life
Phillips was born on 14 May 1933 in Gwaun-Cae-Gurwen, Glamorgan, Wales, the daughter of Sally (née Thomas), a teacher, and David Phillips, a steelworker who became a policeman. She is a Welsh-speaker: in the first volume of her autobiography Private Faces (1999) she notes that she spoke only Welsh for much of her childhood, learning English by listening to the radio.

Phillips attended Pontardawe Grammar School and originally was known there as Jane, but her Welsh teacher called her Siân, the Welsh form of Jane. Later she took up English and philosophy at University College Cardiff.

Phillips graduated from the University of Wales in 1955. She entered the RADA with a scholarship in September 1955, the same year as Diana Rigg and Glenda Jackson. She won the Bancroft Gold Medal for Hedda Gabler and was offered work in Hollywood when she left the RADA. While still a student, she was offered three film contracts to work for an extended period of time in the United States, but she declined, preferring to work on stage.

Career

Early career
Phillips began acting professionally at the age of 11 with the Home Service of BBC Radio in Wales. At the same age she won her first speech-and-drama award for her performance at the National Eisteddfod held at Llandybïe in 1944, where she and a school friend played the parts of two elderly men in a dramatic duologue.

She made her first British television appearance at 17 and won a Welsh acting award at 18. In 1953, while still a student at University College, Cardiff she worked as a newsreader and announcer for the BBC in Wales and toured Wales in Welsh-language productions of the Welsh Arts Council.

From 1953 to 1955, Phillips was a member of the BBC Repertory Company and the National Theatre Company and toured Wales performing Welsh and English plays for the Welsh Arts Council. For the Nottingham Playhouse in 1958, she was Masha in Three Sisters. She performed as Princess Siwan in Saunders Lewis's The King's Daughter at the Hampstead Theatre Club in 1959 and as Katherine in Taming of the Shrew for the Oxford Playhouse in 1960. She was Princess Siwan again in the BBC's production of Siwan: The King's Daughter alongside Peter O'Toole with Emyr Humphrys as producer. It was broadcast on BBC One (Wales only) on 1 March 1960. From October 1958 to April 1959, she was compere of the Land of Song (Gwlad y Gân) monthly programme at TWW (Television Wales and the West) Channel 10 with baritone Ivor Emmanuel.

She made her first appearance on the London stage in 1957 when she appeared in Hermann Sudermann's Magda for RADA. Magda, about an opera diva, was her first real success in London. The play did well and benefited her career greatly; although she was only a student at the time, she was the first since Sarah Bernhardt to play the role.

In 1957, Phillips performed the title role in Ibsen's Hedda Gabler. West End opening at The Duke of York's Theatre, December 3, 1957, with Fredrik Ohlsson as Tesman. They also performed at Det Nye Teatret in Oslo and at The Vanbrugh, RADA .
Many sources consider this her London stage debut but she actually did Magda before Hedda Gabler. In September 1958, she was performing as Margaret Muir in John Hall's The Holiday at Oxford New Theatre.

In May 1958, Phillips performed as Joan in a production of Shaw's Saint Joan by Bryan Bailey, at the Belgrade Theatre in Coventry, which had opened just six weeks before. An observer described her performance: "Sian Phillips' portrayal of Joan defies the law of averages, since, after seeing Siobhan McKenna in the 1955 Arts Theatre production, I reckoned it impossible to equal within half a century. Like the Irish girl, the Welsh girl is perfect.... 'This girl doesn't act Joan – she is Joan.' In short, perfection."

She was Julia in the Royal Shakespeare Company's 1960–1961 version of The Duchess of Malfi. Her Royal Shakespeare Company performances are:
Julia in The Duchess of Malfi: at the Shakespeare Memorial Theatre (Stratford, 30 November 1960, opening night).
Julia in The Duchess of Malfi: at the Aldwych Theatre (London, 15 December 1960, opening night)
Bertha in Ondine: at the Aldwych Theatre (London, 12 January 1961, opening night)
Miss Havisham in Great Expectations: at Royal Shakespeare Company (Stratford, 6 December 2005).

Later film and television
Her long career has included many films and television programmes, but she is perhaps best known for starring as Livia in the popular BBC adaptation of Robert Graves's novel I, Claudius (BBC2, 1976), for which she won the 1977 BAFTA Television Award for Best Actress, and for many appearances on the original run of Call My Bluff. She also appeared opposite her then-husband Peter O'Toole and Richard Burton in Becket (1964); as Ursula Mossbank in the musical film Goodbye, Mr. Chips (1969), again starring O'Toole; once more opposite O'Toole in Murphy's War (1971); as Emmeline Pankhurst in the TV mini-series Shoulder to Shoulder (1974); as Clementine Churchill in Southern Television's Winston Churchill: The Wilderness Years (1981) starring Robert Hardy; as Lady Ann, the unfaithful wife of Alec Guinness's character George Smiley, in the BBC1 espionage dramas Tinker, Tailor, Soldier, Spy (1979) and Smiley's People (1982), adapted from John le Carré's eponymous novels; in Nijinsky (1980); and as the queen Cassiopeia in Clash of the Titans (1981).

Another popular role was that of the Reverend Mother Gaius Helen Mohiam in David Lynch's Dune (1984) and Charal from Ewoks: The Battle for Endor (1985). She also appeared in seasons 2 and 4 (1998 and 2000) of the Canadian TV series La Femme Nikita as Adrian, the renegade founder of the powerful Section One anti-terrorist organisation. In 2001, she appeared as herself in Lily Savage's Blankety Blank. and in Ballykissangel as faith healer Consuela Dunphy in Episode 7 ('One Born Every Minute' or 'Getting Better All the Time'). Her most recent film is The Gigolos (2006) by Richard Bracewell, in which she played Lady James. In 2010, she appeared in New Tricks in the episode "Coming out Ball" and in 2011 she appeared in the episode "Wild Justice" in the fifth season of the television series Lewis. In 2017 she played Lady Yvette Bristow in the TV series Strike. In 2022 she appeared in the series McDonald & Dodds.

Other work
Phillips's West End credits include Marlene (in which she portrayed Marlene Dietrich), Pal Joey, Gigi and A Little Night Music. She has also appeared on the American stage in Marlene.

Her National Theatre performances have included:
Lady Britomart in Major Barbara: The Lyttelton Theatre (18 October 1982, opening night)
Madam Armfeldt in A Little Night Music: Olivier Theatre (18 September 1995, opening night)
Hope in In Bed With Magritte (1 December 1995, opening night).
Madame Neilsen in "Les Blancs": Olivier Theatre (2016)

She provided spoken-word backing to a track on Rufus Wainwright's 2007 album Release the Stars and appeared live with him at the Old Vic Theatre in London on 31 May/1 June 2007. In 2009 Phillips starred in London's West End production of Calendar Girls. Phillips played Juliet opposite Michael Byrne's Romeo in Juliet and her Romeo at the Bristol Old Vic from 10 March to 24 April 2010.

In January 2011 she appeared in a new cabaret show, Crossing Borders, at Wilton's Music Hall in London. One review said: "Her cabaret shows are always of the more traditional type. She’s had a long and very impressive career, and her show followed its progression, with backstage anecdotes about the people she’s met and worked with along the way. It may not be edgy, but it’s a truly delightful evening, by a truly delightful performer, in a truly delightful venue."

In 2015 she played the lead character Fania Fénelon in the Arthur Miller stage version of Playing for Time at Sheffield Theatres.

Awards and nominations

In January 2018, Phillips was recognised for her career spanning more than 70 years at the BBC Audio Drama Awards and was given a Radio Lifetime Achievement Award.

Honours
Phillips was appointed Commander of the Order of the British Empire (CBE) in the 2000 Birthday Honours and Dame Commander of the Order of the British Empire (DBE) in the 2016 New Year Honours for services to drama.

Personal life
Phillips's first husband was Don Roy, a post-graduate student at the University of Wales. They were married in 1956 and divorced in 1959.

Already pregnant with their first child, Phillips married Peter O'Toole in December 1959. They had two daughters: Kate, born 1960, and Patricia, born 1963. Patricia is a theatre practitioner, and Kate is an actress. The couple divorced in 1979, and Phillips wrote about this tempestuous period of her life in Public Places, the second volume of her autobiography.

Her third husband was actor Robin Sachs, who was 17 years her junior. Their relationship began in 1975. They were married on Christmas Eve 1979, shortly after her divorce from O'Toole. Phillips and Sachs divorced in 1991.

Her great aunt was the Welsh evangelist Rosina Davies.

She is a patron of the Bird College of Dance, Music & Theatre Performance, based in Sidcup, Greater London.

Her two volumes of autobiography – Private Faces and Public Places – were published in 1999 and 2001, respectively.

Others
Since 2005, the British Academy of Film and Television Arts Cymru (BAFTA in Wales) has presented the Tlws Sian Phillips Award to a Welshman or woman who has made a significant contribution in either a major feature film or network television programme.

Filmography

Film

Television

Video games

References

External links

Siân Phillips at Mario Huet's web site (Wayback Machine Archive)
Siân Phillips bio, Ammanford Web Site
Siân Phillips at the Wales Video Gallery: this video interview was conducted shortly after Phillips performed in Israel Horovitz's My Old Lady, where she played the 94-year-old Mathilde Giffard. The play opened at the Promenade Theatre on Broadway in October 2002.

1933 births
Actresses awarded damehoods
Alumni of RADA
Best Actress BAFTA Award (television) winners
Dames Commander of the Order of the British Empire
Living people
Royal Shakespeare Company members
Welsh film actresses
Welsh stage actresses
Welsh television actresses
Welsh video game actresses
Welsh-speaking actors
People from Neath Port Talbot
20th-century Welsh actresses
21st-century Welsh actresses